Patrick Michael Neary, C.S.C. (born March 6, 1963) is an American priest of the Catholic Church who serves as Bishop of Saint Cloud in Minnesota. He has worked as a missionary priest in Chile, Kenya and Uganda, held leadership positions in the Congregation of Holy Cross, and filled pastoral assignments in the U.S.

Biography
Patrick Neary was born on March 6, 1963, in La Porte, Indiana, the oldest of six children of Jacob and Marybelle Neary. He joined the Congregation of Holy Cross and as a seminarian attended the University of Notre Dame, earning a bachelor's degree in history in 1985. He then earned a master of divinity degree at the Jesuit School of Theology in Berkeley, California. He took his final vows as a Holy Cross religious in September 1990. He was ordained a priest for the Congregation of Holy Cross on April 6, 1991.

He was parish vicar of Saint John Vianney in Goodyear, Arizona, from 1990 to 1994; a chaplain at the University of Notre Dame from 1994 to 2000, serving Spanish-speaking students in the ROTC program; vice-rector of Moreau Seminary at Notre Dame from 2000 to 2004; a member of the Provincial Council of Indiana from 2003 to 2010; director of the McCauley House of Formation in Nairobi, Kenya for the year 2010-2011; Superior of the District of East Africa for his congregation from 2011 to 2018. He was the pastor of Holy Redeemer Parish in Portland, Oregon, from 2018 to 2022.

Bishop of Saint Cloud
On December 15, 2022, Pope Francis named him Bishop of Saint Cloud.

His episcopal consecration and installation occurred on February 14, 2023.

See also

 Catholic Church hierarchy
 Catholic Church in the United States
 Historical list of the Catholic bishops of the United States
 List of Catholic bishops of the United States
 Lists of patriarchs, archbishops, and bishops

References

External links

Roman Catholic Diocese of Saint Cloud Official Site 
Roman Catholic Archdiocese of Portland

Living people
1963 births
People from La Porte, Indiana
University of Notre Dame alumni
21st-century Roman Catholic priests
20th-century Roman Catholic priests
Bishops appointed by Pope Francis
Congregation of Holy Cross bishops